Ethaliella floccata is a species of sea snail, a marine gastropod mollusk in the family Trochidae, the top snails.

Description
The shell grows to a length of 5 mm, its diameter 9 mm. The shell is much depressed, biconvex, obtusely carinate peripherally and openly umbilicate. Its color is flesh-tinted, with a band below the suture composed of fine obliquely radial dark red lines alternating with white ones. This is followed in the middle of the upper surface by a spiral series of oblique, oblong red blotches alternating with opaque white ones. Below these there is a minutely white-speckled belt, and then at the periphery a series of red spots. On the base of the shell, the  umbilicus is fleshy-whitish; outside of this there is a red area closely mottled with opaque white; and between this tract and the periphery there is a pale zone, sometimes marked with distant radial series of two red dots each. The surface is smooth except at and above the periphery, where there are several spiral  striae.  The 5½ whorls are slightly convex, parted by an impressed suture. The umbilicus is circular and deep, expanding funnel-like at the opening,  where the sloping sides are excavated in the middle and finely sulcate radially. The oblique aperture is subcircular. The peristome  is obtuse. The  columellar margin is broadly dilated, covering a small part of the umbilicus.

Distribution
This marine species occurs off Japan, the Philippines and in the East China Sea.

References

External links
 To Barcode of Life (1 barcode)
 To Encyclopedia of Life
 To GenBank (11 nucleotides; 3 proteins)
 To World Register of Marine Species
 

floccata
Gastropods described in 1903